3/9 may refer to:
March 9 (month-day date notation)
September 3 (day-month date notation)
3rd Battalion, 9th Marines, an infantry battalion of the United States Marine Corps